Neila Tavares (18 September 1948 – 4 June 2022) was a Brazilian actress, television presenter and journalist.

Life and career
She retired from acting in 2013. 

She also worked as a presenter for Rede Manchete and TVE Brasil, and as a journalist for a number of publications, notably collaborating with Folha de S.Paulo. 

Tavares died after a battle with pulmonary emphysema, on 4 June 2022, at the age of 73.

Filmography

References

External links 
 
 Neila Tavares at Enciclopédia Itaú Cultural

1948 births
2022 deaths
People from Niterói
Brazilian film actresses
Brazilian stage actresses
Brazilian television actresses
Brazilian television presenters
Deaths from emphysema